Established in 1962 over a forest area of about 304.03 square kilometres, the Ushakothi Sanctuary is situated at a distance of about 22 kilometres from Sambalpur. To the west of the Sanctuary lies Hirakud Dam. Principally dry deciduous forest type, floral species like sal, sandalwood, arjun, neem, acacia, casuarinas are of frequent occurrence. The fauna includes, amongst others, tigers, elephants, sambar leopards and bison. Presently there are about 15 tigers and 35 elephants in the sanctuary. It is rich in avifaunal wealth and the main attraction of this sanctuary are racket tail drangos and flying squirrel. For night halts there is one two roomed forest rest house inside the sanctuary. The reservations can be done through the Divisional Forest Officer of the same sanctuary, Sambalpur.

References

External links
 Badrama

Geography of Sambalpur district
Tourist attractions in Sambalpur district
Wildlife sanctuaries in Odisha